Major General Abdulaziz al-Shalal was chief of the Syrian military police. He announced his defection to opposition forces in a video aired by Al Arabiya TV on 25 December 2012.

References

Living people
Syrian generals
Year of birth missing (living people)
Members of the Free Syrian Army